Jabhook is a German dramedy broadcast since 2010 as a web series. Alongside the series live events take place at which the story is told.

Plot summary
The series is about a rapper who only started rapping in 2014 but has been producing music since 2008.

Production notes
The series is produced by Sönke Andersen and Frank Dahlmann for the Cologne-based company A³ GmbH. The series was written and directed by Christopher Becker and Daniel Rakete Siegel. The team includes also Peter Hümmeler, Stephan Schiffers, Paul Pieck, Nicole Kortlüke, Stefen Schmitt and Jens Nolte. The series is broadcast on a platform of sports portal Sport1.de.

Reception
Christian Parth described NOTRB in Stern magazine as "the only remarkable event for amateur boxers in Germany".

See also
List of German television series

External links
 official website
 official site on Facebook
 
 Jabhook on crew united

References

2010 German television series debuts
2010 German television series endings
German-language television shows
Boxing mass media
Comedy-drama web series
German web series